This is a list of episodes for Tyler Perry's sitcom Meet the Browns on TBS. Each episode's name begins with "meet" or "meet the".

Series overview

Episodes

Season 1 (2009)

Season 2 (2009)

Season 3 (2009–10)

Season 4 (2010)

Season 5 (2011)

External links
 

Meet the Browns